Iacopo III Appiani (1422 – 22 March 1474) was Prince of Piombino of the Appiani in 1457-1474.

He was born in Piombino, the illegitimate son of Emanuele Appiani.  Despite his reduced finances, he was a patron of the arts: people he housed in his court include the architect Andrea Guardi, which, in 1465–1470, executed a large urbanistic and architectonical renewal of Piombino.

He died at Piombino in 1474, being succeeded by his son Iacopo.

References

Appiani, Iacopo 3
Appiani, Iacopo 3
Iacopo 3
Appiani, Iacopo 3
Appiani, Iacopo 3